Yeşiltepe  (former Çatalkeli) is a town in Mersin Province, Turkey.

Geography
Karabucak Forest is slightly at the north. The population is 2242 as of 2012.

History
No document exists about the deep history of the settlement. But probably before the project of Karabucak forest during the republican era, it was only a small village because of the marshes around the village which made the otherwise fertile plains unarable. After the World War I the village (then known as Çatalkeli) was occupied by the French army. After the treaty of Ankara (1921) and the project of Karabucak forest, the population of the village began to increase. The name of the village was changed to Çataltepe in 1965 and to Çatalkuyu after a merger with another settlement. In 1989, the village was declared a township and renamed as Yeşiltepe.

Economy
The town enjoys triple cropping income. Main products are vegetables such as leek, cabbage and tomato. Water melon is another important crop.

References

Populated places in Tarsus District
Towns in Turkey